The Darren Sanders Show is an Australian talk show television series aired on Channel 31 in 2012. An initial order of 4 weekly episodes will air on Nine's digital channel GO! from 2 October 2013, hosted by Darren Sanders.

References

9Go! original programming
Australian television talk shows
Australian community access television shows
2012 Australian television series debuts